The Belleview-Biltmore Resort and Spa was a historic resort hotel located at 25 Belleview Boulevard in the town of Belleair, Florida, United States. The  hotel structure was the last remaining grand historic hotel of its period in Florida that existed as a resort, and the only Henry Plant hotel still in operation when it closed in 2009. The building was noted for its architectural features, with its green sloped roof and white wood-sided exterior, and handcrafted woodwork and Tiffany glass inside. Constructed of native Florida heart pine wood, it was the second-largest occupied wooden structure in the United States after 1938; only the Hotel Del Coronado in San Diego was larger.

The Belleview-Biltmore is situated on the highest point of the Florida coastline with views of the bay and the barrier islands which border the Gulf of Mexico. The hotel was built in the summer of 1896 by railroad tycoon Henry B. Plant and opened January 15, 1897.  Originally known as the Belleview Hotel, it was added to the U.S. National Register of Historic Places on December 26, 1979 as Belleview-Biltmore Hotel and removed in 2017 following its relocation.

When the last member of the Plant family died in 1918 the hotel was sold to John McEntee Bowman founder of the Biltmore hotel chain. He renamed the hotel the Belleview-Biltmore in 1926 during a rebranding of his hotel chain.

The hotel closed in 2009 and thereafter the property deteriorated from neglect. Despite the hotel's historic designation and efforts by preservation groups to save it, various proposals to restore the property as a resort hotel were unsuccessful and the owners began demolition in 2015 for condominiums. A portion of the 1897 structure was saved and relocated on a new foundation and restored as The Belleview Inn, a boutique inn. The Belleview Inn is a member of Historic Hotels of America.

The Belleview-Biltmore hosted dignitaries and world leaders through the years, including U.S. Presidents Barack Obama, George H. W. Bush, Jimmy Carter, and Gerald Ford, former British Prime Minister Margaret Thatcher and the Duke of Windsor, as well as celebrities such as Joe DiMaggio, Babe Ruth, Thomas Edison, and Henry Ford. The Hotel was featured in a segment on the Weird Travels series on the Travel Channel television network in the U.S., which was filmed in March 2004 by Authentic Entertainment.

History

1897–1942
The Belleview Hotel opened on January 15, 1897. It was constructed by Henry B. Plant as a resort destination to boost tourist travel on his railroad line serving the west coast of Florida, which he had acquired in 1893 as part of his expanding Plant System network of railroads. The Atlantic Coast Line Railroad, which absorbed the Plant System lines in 1902, continued to operate the Pinellas Special (trains nos. 95 and 96) train from New York City to a siding on the hotel's property in the 1920s. John McEntee Bowman purchased the hotel in 1919 and absorbed it into his growing, well-known Bowman-Biltmore Hotels. He renamed the structure the Belleview Biltmore in 1926.

World War II and the post-war years
During World War II, the Belleview Biltmore served as lodging for servicemen who were stationed at Macdill Air Force Base in Tampa.

After World War II, the hotel was bought by Bernard F. Powell.

In the 1970s and 1980s, the aging hotel began to decline as changing travel patterns and intensified competition from newer beach-front motels caused significant losses.

In preparation for his 1976 Rolling Thunder Revue tour, musician Bob Dylan spent much of April rehearsing at the Belleview Biltmore with his troupe. Band members included Roger McGuinn of The Byrds, violinist Scarlet Rivera, and folk queen Joan Baez. Dylan would eventually play two shows on the 22nd in the hotel's Starlight Ballroom.

A Japanese company, Mido Development, purchased the hotel from Powell in 1990-1991, renaming it the Belleview Mido Resort Hotel. Mido made many repairs and additions, including a new spa area and entrance, later selling the property to hotelier Salim Jetha in 1997. The addition was made to create a more modern appearance upon entry, At the same time, the fifth floor of the building was closed off and left in a varying state of disrepair.

21st century
In 2001, attempts were made to restore common areas and guest rooms continuing on to 2004. During the summer of 2004, the hotel suffered a glancing blows from hurricanes Jeane and Francis, causing severe damage to an already deteriorated roof, setting the plans to fully restore the building into limbo. Tom Cook Construction Inc. was hired to place protective coverings over the building while plans were made to replace this existential part of the building. In late 2004, DeBartolo Development Group offered to purchase the property from Belleview Biltmore Resort, Ltd., then owned by Urdang and Associates, to demolish the hotel structure and replace it with retail shopping and  condominiums. The proposal was withdrawn in January 2005, however, after public outrage over the plan, the developers citing lack of public support. However, in April 2005, published reports said that the DeBartolo group was once again planning to purchase the hotel, and had it under contract with Urdang and Associates, raising concerns among historic preservationists when it was disclosed that DeBartolo had filed a demolition permit application with the Town of Belleair (where the hotel is located) to demolish the Belleview Biltmore.

Preservationists argued that measures to protect historic structures should be adopted by Pinellas County or the Town of Belleair, citing hotels elsewhere of similar age which have been successfully restored while offering updated services and amenities, such as the Grand Hotel on Mackinac Island in Michigan, the Hotel del Coronado in San Diego, and the Williamsburg Inn in Williamsburg, Virginia.

On March 9, 2007, the St. Petersburg Times reported that Legg Mason had entered into a purchase contract for the hotel, with the intent of preserving it.<ref>Rita Farlow, St. Petersburg Times, March 9, 2007.</ref> "Executives with Legg Mason Real Estate Investors would not disclose the proposed purchase price or the closing date, but said in a written statement they had a contract to buy the resort and intend to preserve the 110-year-old hotel," the Times'' reported. Legg Mason engaged the services of historic preservation architect Richard J. Heisenbottle, FAIA to prepare restoration and re-development plans for the project. In May 2008, the Town of Belleair approved Heisenbottle's plans to restore and expand the hotel, which included a new spa and underground garages, following purchase of the property by Legg Mason Real Estate Investors (now Latitude Management Real Estate Investors) for $30.3 million.

Closure
On January 29, 2009, it was announced that the resort would close at the end of May for the three-year, $100 million renovation project, reopening in 2012, the hotel's managing director said. Following the hotel's mid-2009 closing, however, an attorney for owner Latitude Management said that the renovation work has been stalled due to litigation by nearby residents, who object to some aspects of the re-development plans. Meanwhile, the Belleair code board voted on November 2, 2009, to begin fining the owners of the now-closed hotel $250 per day for failure to repair the hotel's "dilapidated and deteriorated" roof.

In 2010, the Legg-Mason plan was withdrawn and other investors came forward. The Ades brothers, from Miami,  purchased the vacant hotel and indicated in December 2011, that they planned to demolish the hotel and replace it with condominiums. The city government, according to reports, expressed willingness to approve demolition of the hotel.

On January 9, 2012, the owner of the property sought to demolish the hotel to build as many as 180 townhomes on the site.

On December 13, 2013, it was reported that another potential investor, Belleview Biltmore Partners LLC, was negotiating the lease and purchase of the hotel and the golf club, hoping to restore the hotel. Managing Partner Richard Heisenbottle said, "We do not subscribe to the theory that the landmark Belleview Biltmore Hotel & Resort is beyond repair and can no longer be restored."

Demolition

In 2014, the Belleair Town Commission approved plans by the current owner, JMC Communities, for a $125 million development  to tear down all but the original structure's roughly 38,000-square-feet west wing, or 10 percent, after first documenting the hotel's history through photographs and written catalogs. A portion would be converted into a boutique inn with salvaged pieces incorporated into the decor. The inn would then be joined by 132 new condos and townhomes, according to the plans.

On May 9, 2015, demolition began by JMC, whose principal is developer Mike Cheezem.

The Friends of the Belleview Biltmore, an organization fighting to save the historic structure, along with the Florida Trust for Historic Preservation and the National Trust for Historic Preservation, sought an injunction to forestall further demolition. In December, 2015, the Belleair Town Attorney said that all lawsuits had been "voluntarily withdrawn" by the parties, thereby allowing the developer to proceed with continued demolition and construction of new townhomes and condominiums, preserving a portion of the 1897 structure as a small boutique hotel. The building was removed from the National Register of Historic Places in October 2017.

Relocation 

On December 21, 2016 the preserved portion of the Belleview-Biltmore Hotel was placed on hydraulic dollies and moved 230 feet. The structure was placed on a new foundation where it was restored and reopened in December, 2018, as the Belleview Inn, a boutique hotel.

See also

Henry B. Plant Museum

References

External links

The Belleview Inn official website
Belleview Place development official website
Haunted Belleview Biltmore Hotel
Save The Biltmore Preservation Website
Pinellas County listings at National Register of Historic Places
Florida's Office of Cultural and Historical Programs – Belleview-Biltmore Hotel
R.J. Heisenbottle Architects Restoration Plan
Photos of the relocation from Wolfe House & Building Movers

Bowman-Biltmore Hotels
Former National Register of Historic Places in Florida
Hotel buildings completed in 1897
Hotel buildings on the National Register of Historic Places in Florida
Hotels established in 1897
Hotels in Florida
Queen Anne architecture in Florida
Railway hotels in the United States
Shingle Style architecture in Florida
Historic Hotels of America